Natalka Bilotserkivets (born November 8, 1954) is a Ukrainian poet and translator.

She was born in the village of Kuianivka near Sumy and was educated at Kyiv University. She married the critic Mykola Riabchuk and lives in Kyiv. She works as an editor for Ukrainian Culture magazine.

Her first collection of poems Ballad about the Invincibles (Balada pro neskorenykh) was published in 1976, while she was still in university. She has also published the collections The Underground Fire ( Підземний вогонь) (1984) and November (Листопад) (1989). The collections Allergy (Алергія) (1999) and Central Hotel (Готель Централь) (2004) were the winners of Book of the Month contests in 2000 and 2004 respectively.

Virlana Tkacz and Wanda Phipps started translating Natalka Bilotserkivets's work in 1991 when Yara Arts Group performed a bilingual version of her poem “May” for the event "Fiver Years After," a commemoration of the Chornobyl nuclear accident, presented at the Ukrainian Institute of America in New York. The following winter Virlana used Bilotserkivets's “May” as the core text in Yara's theatre piece "Explosions" presented at La MaMa Experimental Theatre in New York. Tkacz and Phipps were awarded the Poetry Translation Prize by Agni Journal for their translation. Agni also published the poem in 1991.

References 

1954 births
Living people
Ukrainian women poets
Ukrainian translators
People from Sumy Oblast
20th-century Ukrainian women writers
21st-century Ukrainian poets
21st-century translators
20th-century translators
Taras Shevchenko National University of Kyiv alumni
21st-century Ukrainian women writers